The Territory of Montana was an organized incorporated territory of the United States that existed from May 26, 1864, until November 8, 1889, when it was admitted as the 41st state in the Union as the state of Montana.

Original boundaries

The Montana Territory was organized out of the existing Idaho Territory by Act of Congress and signed into law by President Abraham Lincoln on May 26, 1864. The areas east of the Continental Divide had been previously part of the Nebraska Territory and Dakota Territory and had been acquired by the United States in the Louisiana Purchase.

The territory also included a portion of the Idaho Territory west of the continental divide and east of the Bitterroot Range, which had been acquired by the United States in the Oregon Treaty, and originally included in the Oregon Territory. The part of the Oregon Territory that became part of Montana had been split off as part of the Washington Territory.

The boundary between the Washington Territory and Dakota Territory was the Continental Divide (as shown on the 1861 map); however, the boundary between the Idaho Territory and the Montana Territory followed the Bitterroot Range north of 46°30′ north (as shown on the 1864 map). This change was due in part to Congress unifying the area with the creation of Idaho Territory in 1863, coupled with the subsequent political maneuvering of Sidney Edgerton, soon to be the first Territorial Governor of Montana, and his allies in the Congress. They successfully implemented the boundary change that won the Flathead and Bitterroot valleys for Montana Territory. The Organic Act of the Territory of Montana defines the boundary as extending from the modern intersection of Montana, Idaho, and Wyoming at: 
The forty-fourth degree and thirty minutes of north latitude; thence due west along said forty-fourth degree and thirty minutes of north latitude to a point formed by its intersection with the crest of the Rocky Mountains; thence following the crest of the Rocky Mountains northward till its intersection with the Bitter Root Mountains; thence northward along the crest of the Bitter Root Mountains to its intersection with the thirty-ninth degree of longitude west from Washington; thence along said thirty-ninth degree of longitude northward to the boundary line of British possessions.

Upon the establishment of the Wyoming Territory in 1868, an enclave of Dakota Territory known as Lost Dakota was accidentally created. This error was overlooked by the federal government until 1873, when it was annexed and thereby incorporated into Gallatin County, Montana. The Montana Territory was admitted to the Union as the State of Montana on November 8, 1889.

Government
The act of Congress of 1864 creating Montana, known as the Organic Act, prescribed a somewhat standard organization for the territorial government of Montana.  It established executive, judicial, and legislative branches of government, however, the federal government held a dominant role in administering the new territory.  Particularly, the Congress reserved the right to nullify any laws passed by the citizen-elected territorial legislature.  The President of the United States appointed the most powerful positions in the territory, including a governor, secretary of the territory, and three members of the territorial supreme court, with the advice and consent of the U.S. Senate.  The citizens of the territory elected a legislative assembly, consisting of a Council and House of Representatives, which together created the laws for the territory.  Citizens also elected a lone delegate to Congress as strictly an advisor to the U.S. House of Representatives; a territorial delegate was not permitted to vote.  The territorial government was meant to provide a training ground for a future move to statehood, allowing time for an area's institutions to mature and populations to grow.

Executive

Governor
The governor served a four-year term, unless removed by the President.  Duties of the office included 1) the faithful execution of the laws, 2) to serve as the commander-in-chief of the militia, and 3) to serve as the superintendent of Indian affairs.  The governor also had to approve or veto laws within three days of passage by the territorial legislative assembly.

 Parties
Dem Democratic
Rep Republican

Secretary of the territory
The secretary of the territory served a four-year term, unless removed by the President.  Duties of the office included 1) the recording of all laws and proceedings of the legislative assembly and the acts of the governor, 2) the transmission of copies of the laws and journals of the legislative assembly to the President and the leaders of Congress, and 3) the transmission of executive proceedings and correspondence twice a year to the President.  Importantly, the secretary also served as acting governor in case of the death, removal, resignation, or absence of the governor from the territory.

 Parties
Dem Democratic
Rep Republican

Congressional delegation
The eligible citizens of Montana Territory voted for a delegate to Congress, electing them to a two-year term.  The territorial delegate had a seat in the House of Representatives and, as any other representative, participated in debates, yet they did not have the right to vote.  During the time Montana was a territory, some delegates to Congress were allowed to sit on select committees and even standing committees of the House, yet as on the floor of the House, they were not permitted to vote.

 Parties
Dem Democratic
Rep Republican

See also

History of Montana
Bibliography of Montana history
Historical outline of Montana
List of people in Montana history
Montana in the American Civil War
State of Montana
Territorial evolution of Montana
Timeline of Montana history
Timeline of pre-statehood Montana history
Timeline of Billings, Montana

Notes

References

 
 
 
 
 
 
 
 
 

 

Former organized territories of the United States
History of Montana
History of the American West
History of the Rocky Mountains
History of the Northwestern United States

1889 disestablishments in the United States